IPB University (abbreviated as IPB) is a state-run agricultural university based in the regency of Bogor, Indonesia.

The institute began as an agricultural school formed by the Dutch colonial regime in the early 20th century. After independence it was part of the University of Indonesia before becoming an independent institute on September 1, 1963. Prof. Dr. Arif Satria, S.P., M.Si. serves as its director.

History

The first school in Bogor was established in 1876 under Rudolph Scheffer, under the name landbouwschool te Buitenzorg (agriculture school). New schools for different fields were opened in the following years for Native Indonesians. The institute started in the early 20th century as a veterinary medicine and agricultural school. Before World War II, the institutions were known as Middelbare Landbouwschool (secondary agricultural school), Middelbare Bosbouwschool (secondary forestry school) dan Nederlandsch Indiche Veeartsenschool (veterinary school). H. J. Lovink's appointment as department director of agricultural education in 1910 marked a curriculum shift toward training for the government and private sides of colonial agribusiness, including basic biology classes augmented with practical education about cultivation techniques and technologies. Lovink argued that department officials in the Ministry of Agriculture "needed to familiarize themselves with Javanese farming practices."In 1940, the Dutch government founded an Institution of Agricultural Higher Education in Bogor with the name Landbouw Hogeschool, which later on 31 October 1941 was called Landbouwkundige Faculteit (Agronomy Faculty). However, the school was closed down during the Japanese occupation (1942-1945). The Nederlandsch Indische Veeartsenschool remained in operation, but its name was changed to Bogōru jūigakkō (ボゴール獣医学校) (Bogor Veterinary School).

After the declaration of independence in 1946, the Ministry of Social Welfare of the new Republic of Indonesia upgraded the Veterinary School in Bogor to the College of Veterinary Medicine (PTKH).

The Netherlands returned to Indonesia and retook control of the institution in 1947, thus Landbouwkundige Faculteit was reopened as the Faculteit Voor Landbouw-Wetenschappen, which had majors in Agriculture and Forestry. In 1948 the PTKH or College of Veterinary Medicine was changed to Faculteit voor Diergeneeskunde under Universiteit van Indonesië (later the University of Indonesia). 
 
After Indonesia gained its independence in 1950, Landbouw-wetenschappen became the Faculty of Agriculture of the University of Indonesia, with three departments — Socio-Economics, Physical Sciences, and Forestry. In 1957 the Department of Land Fishery was formed. Meanwhile, Faculteit voor Dieergeneeskunde became the Faculty of Veterinary Medicines and Animal Husbandry.

IPB was founded on September 1, 1963 by the decision of the Minister of Science and Higher Education No. 92/1963 and was approved by President Sukarno's decree No. 279/1965. At the time, the two faculties of University of Indonesia which is in Bogor were separated into an independent institution. The new university (IPB) has five faculties: Agriculture, Veterinary Medicine, Fisheries, Animal Science, and Forestry. In 1964 the Faculty of Technology and Mechanization of Agriculture was added.

Recent events
On December 26, 2000 the Indonesia government changed IPB's autonomy status to a state-owned university.

In 2005, IPB applied the minor and major system instead of the national curriculum system. This allow IPB students to take more than one department field.

Symbol and flags

Logo and philosophy
The logo consist of "Institut Pertanian Bogor" text, a tree with three branches and five leaves, and an open book which are all lined by a white circle on a blue background. The logo reflects IPB as an academic institution, source of knowledge and technology, with the "Tridarma Perguruan Tinggi" obligation.

The basic blue color symbolizes IPB as a science and technology university, the open book symbolizes IPB as a source of knowledge, the circle symbolizes that science has no limits and always growing, the three branches growing from the book symbolize Tridarma Perguruan Tinggi (IPB's three commitments: Education, Research, and Community Service), and the five leaves represent the first five faculties of IPB and symbolize Tridarma Perguruan Tinggi which is based on Pancasila.

Flags
The Institut Pertanian Bogor main flag is yellow with IPB emblem in the middle. Each faculty has its own logo and flag based on the IPB logo and flag.
 Diploma Program: black.
 Faculty of Agricultural Engineering and Technology: red.
 Faculty of Agriculture: green.
 Faculty of Animal Science: brown.
 Faculty of Economics and Management: orange.
 Faculty of Fisheries and Marine Science: light blue.
 Faculty of Forestry: grey.
 Faculty of Human Ecology: tosca green.
 Faculty of Mathematics and Natural Science: white.
 Faculty of Veterinary Medicine: violet.
 School of Business: maroon.
Faculties have a white IPB emblem in the middle, except the Faculty of Mathematics and Natural Science. The Faculty of Mathematics and Natural Science have a blue colored IPB emblem in the middle.

Campuses

 IPB Baranang Siang Campus
 IPB Cilibende
 IPB Dramaga Campus
 IPB Gunung Gede Campus
 IPB Taman Kencana

Faculties and departments

Institut Pertanian Bogor has agricultural, livestock, veterinary, and life science studies.

IPB consist of nine faculties providing an undergraduate program. Graduate and postgraduate programs are managed by a separate graduate school. In 1972, IPB implemented a four-year undergraduate curriculum and, in 1975, opened the first graduate school in Indonesia.

IPB undergraduate new students are required to pass a Common First Year Program (Tingkat Persiapan Bersama (TPB)) or know well-known as General Competency Education Program (Program Pendidikan Kompetensi Umum (PPKU)) before entering any faculties or department although they are enrolled as a student of specific faculties and department. They are also required to live in dormitories during the first year.

Institut Pertanian Bogor has a diploma program that is separated from the faculties and managed under the Directorate of Diploma Program. Unlike the undergraduate students, a common first year program is unavailable for diploma program students.

Faculty of Agriculture
 Agronomy and Horticulture 
 Landscape Architecture 
 Soil Science and Land Resources 
 Plant Protection

Faculty of Veterinary Medicine
 Anatomy, Physiology and Pharmacology
 Animal Diseases and Veterinary Public Health
 Clinics, Reproduction and Pathology

Faculty of Fisheries and Marine Science 
 Aquaculture 
 Resources Management Living Aquatic
 Marine Science and Technology 
 Fisheries Resources Utilization 
 Aquatic Product Technology

Faculty of Animal Sciences
 Nutrition Science and Feed Technology 
 Animal Production and Technology

Faculty of Forestry 
The Faculty of Forestry  in 1963 consisted of two departments: Forest Management and Exploitation; and Forest Products Processing. Which later became the Department of Forest Products in 1969 and then the Department of Forest Products Technology in 1983, when Department of Forest Resources Conservation was formed. In 2005, Faculty of Forestry developed into its present four departments: 
 Forest Management
 Forest Product Technology
 Forest Resources Conservation and Ecotourism
 Silviculture 

It offers bachelor's and master's degrees and doctorates in forest management science, fiber and composite technology, forest product quality improvement and engineering, tropical biodiversity, ecotourism and environmental services management, and tropical silviculture.

Faculty of Agricultural Engineering and Technology
 Mechanical and Biosystem Engineering  (previously Agricultural Engineering)
 Food Science and Technology 
 Agroindustrial Technology 
 Civil and Environmental Engineering

Faculty of Mathematics and Natural Sciences
 Geophysics and Meteorology 
 Department of Statistics 
 Biology 
The Department of Biology consists of Undergraduate Program in Biology (S1); Master Program (S2) and Doctoral Program (S3) in Microbiology, Animal Biosciences, and Plant Biology. All study programs have been accredited A by Badan Akreditasi Nasional Perguruan Tinggi (BAN-PT). Education, Research, and Community Service activities in the department are supported by well planned programs and good quality of faculty members. Student activities are fully supported by the department.
 Chemistry 
 Mathematics 
 Computer Science 
 Physics 
 Biochemistry

Faculty of Economics and Management
 Economics 
 Management 
 Agribusiness 
 Resource and Environmental Economics

Faculty of Human Ecology

History 
The Faculty of Human Ecology (FEMA) is the youngest faculty in IPB; it was established on August 2, 2005 by the Rector's decree no. 112/K13/OT/2005.  his establishment was IPB's answer to changes that were taking place toward the era of higher education autonomy (IPB BHMN) which granted the university the power to form new study programs, departments, and faculties.

The roots of FEMA IPB were the former Department of Community Nutrition and Family Resource (GMSK) of Faculty of Agriculture; Study Program of Agriculture Extension and Communication of Socioeconomy Department, Faculty of Agriculture; and socioeconomic study programs of all the other faculties in IPB.

The Department of Community Nutrition and Family Resource (GMSK) of Faculty of Agriculture was developed into Department of Community Nutrition (GIZ) and Department of Family and Consumer Sciences (IKK). While the Department of Agricultural Socioeconomy (SOSEK) of Faculty of Agriculture was transformed into Department of Communication and Community Development (KPM), Department of Agribusiness, and Department of Environmental Resource Economy (ESL). Furthermore; through the clustering process; the Department of Community Nutrition (GIZ), the Department of Family and Consumer Sciences (IKK), and the Department of Communication and Community Development (KPM) merged up to become the Faculty of Human Ecology (FEMA).

FEMA IPB is the first and only faculty of its kind in Indonesia and it is one of the three faculties of human ecology throughout South East Asia. The others are in the College of Human Ecology University of Philippines at Los Banos (UPLB) and the Faculty of Human Ecology, Universiti Putra Malaysia (UPM).

 The university conducts higher education on human ecology focusing on nutritional sciences, family and consumer sciences, and communication & community development sciences.
 It runs researches and advances the development of science and technology in human ecology for social transformation.

Departments 
 Community Nutrition 
 Family and Consumer Science 
 Communication and Community Development Science

Community Nutrition 

Mandate:

To develop human nutrition science and its application in individual, family and community that involves agriculture, food, nutrition, and health.

Sections:
 Basic Nutrition
 Applied Nutrition
 Food and Environmental Health Management
 Food and Nutrition Policy
 Faculty of Human Ecology 
 Community Nutrition 
 Family and Consumer Science 
 Communication and Community Development Science

School of Business 

 Business

Seed Center
The university plans develop a Seed Center at Leuwikopo, Dramaga, Bogor due to Indonesia has to import seeds so far and facing a problem of seed supply. The center will develop agricultural seeds, plantation seeds, animal husbandry and fishery.

Green Campus
Starting on September 1, 2015 no ordinary fuel-vehicles are allowed to enter Green Campus Area. The authority provides 1,500 rental bikes, 44 electric cars and 20 gas-fueled buses. Electric cars and buses should have their fare paid electronically.

Ranking

The QS Asia University Rangkings 2022 has ranked Bogor Agricultural University as number 112. In 2023, Bogor Agricultural University was ranked 449th worldwide according to the Top QS World University Rankings 2023, as well as ranked 112th in the Top QS Asian University Rankings 2022 (fifth in Indonesia after Gadjah Mada University, Bandung Institute of Technology, University of Indonesia and Airlangga University).

Student organizations
 The Student Consultative Assembly (Majelis Permusyawaratan Mahasiswa / MPM): student consultative body only available at university level.
 The Student Representative Council (Dewan Perwakilan Mahasiswa / DPM): student legislative body at university level and faculty level.
 The Student Executive Board (Badan Eksekutif Mahasiswa / BEM): student executive body at university and faculty level.
 The Student Activities Unit (Unit Kegiatan Mahasiswa / UKM): several organizations purposed to aid developing students' hobby, talent, or interest.
 Spirituality: Islamic Students Spiritual Agency (BKIM, Badan Kerohanian Islam Mahasiswa), Fellowship of Christian Students (PMK), Indonesia Catholic Student Union (KEMAKI), Buddhist Student Union (KMBA), and Hindu Dharma Student Union.
 Sports: Soccer, Futsal, Basket Ball, Badminton, Volley Ball, Table Tennis, Tennis, Chess, and Archery.
 Martial Arts: Pencak Silat, Aikido, Karate BKC, Tae Kwon Do, Sin Lam Ba, and Thifan Po Khan.
 Arts: Agria Swara Student Choir, Sundanese Art Environment "Gentra Kaheman", and Musical Art "Music Agriculture X-pression".
 Specialized activities: Student Regiment, Scout, Nature Lovers "Lawalata", PMI Voluntary Corps, and Center of Entrepreneurship Development for Youth (Century).
 Academics: International Association of Students in Agriculture and Related Sciences-Local Committee IPB (IAAS-LC IPB), Fauna Conservation Union (UKF), Scientific Studies Forum (FORCES-IPB).
 Journalistic: Gema Almamater, and Campus Newspaper.

Notable alumni
 Anton Apriantono, Minister of Agriculture of the Republic of Indonesia (2004–2009).
 Dr. Ir. Hasjrul Harahap, Minister of Environment and Forestry of the Republic of Indonesia (1988–1993). 
 Iqbal Assegaf, Indonesian political activist, member of the People's Representative Council of Indonesia period 1998-2003 from the Golkar Party.
 Nur Mahmudi Ismail, Minister of Environment and Forestry of the Republic of Indonesia (1999–2001), Mayor of Depok (2005–2010).
 Mustafa Abubakar, State Minister for State Enterprises of the Republic of Indonesia (2009–2011).
 Siti Nurbaya Bakar, Minister of Environment and Forestry of the Republic of Indonesia (2014–Present).
 Susilo Bambang Yudhoyono, sixth President of Indonesia.
 Ir. Suswono MM, Minister of Agriculture of the Republic of Indonesia (2009–2014).
 Taufik Ismail (1935-), writer and poet. 
 Andi Hakim Nasoetion, scholar
 Sajogjo, founder of Indonesian poverty line
 Bungaran Saragih, Minister of Agriculture (2001–2004)
 Rokhmin Dahuri, Minister of Marine and Fishery (2001–2004)
 Andung A. Nitimihardja, Minister of Industry (2004–2005), Commissioner of PLN
 Prof. Dr. Ir. Sjarifuddin Baharsyah, Minister of Agriculture (1993–1998)
 Prof. Dr. Ir. Yustika Baharsyah, Minister of Agriculture (March 1998-December 1998) and Minister of Social
 Prof. Dr. Ir. Didik J Rachbini, Professor at the University of Indonesia and Member of Parliament (2004–2009)

See also

 List of universities in Indonesia
 Education in Indonesia
 Bogor Botanical Gardens
 List of forestry universities and colleges

References

Colleges in Indonesia
Educational institutions established in 1963
Agricultural universities and colleges
Forestry education
Forestry in Indonesia
1963 establishments in Indonesia
Bogor
IPB University
Indonesian state universities